Dark Shadows: The Wicked and the Dead is a Big Finish Productions original dramatic reading based on the long-running American horror soap opera series Dark Shadows.

Plot 
Reverend Gregory Trask has been locked up alive in the walls of Collinwood. As he descends into madness, he is visited by the ghost of Carl Collins.

Cast
Gregory Trask – Jerry Lacy
Carl Collins – John Karlen

External links
Dark Shadows - The Wicked and the Dead

Dark Shadows audio plays
2008 audio plays